ATZ may refer to:
 Aerodrome Traffic Zone (ATZ)
 Military Aerodrome Traffic Zone (MATZ)
 IATA code of Assiut Airport
 Automobiltechnische Zeitschrift
 5-Aminotetrazole